Obafluorin is a β-lactone antibiotic with the molecular formula C17H14N2O7. Obafluorin is produced by the bacterium Pseudomonas fluorescens. Obafluorin is a inhibitor of serine hydroxymethyltransferase.

References

Further reading 

 
 
 

antibiotics
Beta-lactones
Transferase inhibitors
Catechols
Benzamides
Nitrobenzenes